Tamaryn Hendler and Chichi Scholl were the defending champions, but they did not partner up together. Hendler partnered with Alexandra Mueller while Scholl partnered up with Scholl. Hendler and Mueller lost in the first round, while Scholls lost in the quarterfinals.

Shuko Aoyama and Xu Yifan won the title, defeating Julia Glushko and Olivia Rogowska in the final, 7–5, 6–7(4–7), [10–4].

Seeds

Draw

References 
 Main Draw

Fifth Third Bank Tennis Championships - Women's Doubles
2012 WD